Wu-Tang Forever is the second studio album of American hip hop group Wu-Tang Clan, released June 3, 1997, on Loud/RCA Records in the United States. Pressed as a double album, it was released after a long run of successful solo projects from various members of the group, and serves as the follow-up to their debut album Enter the Wu-Tang (36 Chambers). Forever features several guest appearances from Wu-Tang affiliates Cappadonna, Streetlife, 4th Disciple, True Master, and Tekitha. The original run of compact discs featured an "Enhanced CD" which allowed users to walk around the "Wu Mansion" and access additional content.

Music and lyrics

Production
While the group's previous album is known for its minimalistic production style, producer RZA had been expanding the musical backdrop of each solo Wu-Tang album since then. Raekwon's Only Built 4 Cuban Linx..., in particular, was praised for its cinematic feel. RZA earned accolades for his new dense style of production, incorporating strings, heavy synthesizers, and the kung-fu samples of old. The production of the record also pioneered RZA's technique of chopping up and speeding up soul samples so that it becomes unusually high-pitched; this style of production would later become influential on producers such as Just Blaze and Kanye West. Wu-Tang Forever marked the first group album in which RZA assigned some of the album's production to Wu-Tang protégés True Master and 4th Disciple, as well as Wu-Tang member Inspectah Deck.

Lyrical themes
The lyrics differed in many ways from those of 36 Chambers, with many verses written in stream-of-consciousness style, while being influenced by the teachings of the Five-Percent Nation. The group showed mature depth, speaking on the pitfalls of life's vices ("A Better Tomorrow") and the harsh realities of inner city life. "Impossible", for instance, touches on the less-than-glamorous realities of the same violence that the group often raps about.

The Clan took advantage of the double-disc format, allowing each of the nine members a significant number of appearances, including four solo tracks. Several have been recognized as particularly strong performances.

Inspectah Deck raised his stock in the public eye with The Sources Hip-Hop Quotable for his performance on "Triumph". This verse is considered one of the greatest in hip-hop. Despite being one of the last members to release a solo album, Deck's contributions throughout Wu-Tang Forever led to him being a sought-after collaborator for other artists; he would appear on subsequent tracks with Gang Starr, Pete Rock and Big Pun, among others.

Ghostface Killah continued his rise to fame with a verse in "Impossible", hailed by RZA in the Wu-Tang Manual as "the greatest Wu-Tang verse ever written". It was also featured in The Sources Hip-Hop Quotable. "Cash Still Rules/Scary Hours" has also been noted as one of Ghostface’s more memorable verses on the album, notable for the way in which the verse cuts off, first popularizing the feel that he could "go on forever". Ghostface Killah would follow his work on Forever with Supreme Clientele, which is generally regarded as a classic.

"The sum of our parts is worth all the organizing," said Method Man. "It's like the Power Rangers where they come together to form that Megazord shit. Them guys are lethal but, when they come together, it's even more incredible. This album will destroy every hip-hop record made in the past ten years."

Critical reception

Upon its release, Wu-Tang Forever received positive reviews from music critics, who praised RZA's production work and the group members' lyricism.  Matt Diehl from Entertainment Weekly commented, "Forever continues the group's artistic grand slam. Like their forebears in Public Enemy, Wu-Tang are musical revolutionaries, unafraid to bring the noise along with their trunk of funk. The RZA allows a few outside producers behind the board this time, but it's his gritty samples and numbing beats that get the party moving." Sasha Frere-Jones from Spin called it an album "for hip-hop junkies, rhyme followers who want to hear their favorite sword-swallowers drop unusually good styles over unusually good beats." Comparing some of the album's production to that of Wu-Tang member GZA's Liquid Swords (also produced by RZA), Neil Strauss from The New York Times wrote a favorable review of the album and stated "Wu-Tang Forever is a smooth, clean set of 25 songs and two speeches, with only a few throwaways on the second CD. The Wu-Tang Clan offers something for every kind of rap fan. More important, after a four-year wait, on Wu-Tang Forever the Clan retains its mantle as rap's standard bearers." Melody Maker gave Wu-Tang Forever a favorable review as well, stating "It had to be this big. It didn't have to be this good ... Every single track is a detonation of every single pop rule you thought sacrosanct ...Forever is one of the greatest hip hop LPs of all time." Stephen Thomas Erlewine from AllMusic stated:

Describing the album's lyrics as "hauntingly descriptive tales of ghetto hustlers and victims," Rolling Stones Nathan Brackett stated "The whole of Wu-Tang Forever crackles with a shootout-at-midnight electricity that more than justifies the double-disc indulgence, while the back-and-forth wordfire of Method Man, Raekwon, Ghostface Killah, etc. confirms the Clan's singular zing at the mic, and their ghetto-wise might as storytellers." Cheo Hodari Coker from the Los Angeles Times commented, "The Clan's beats push the limit between cutting-edge hip-hop and industrial feedback, with jugular-clutching rhymes following their own melodic dictates and insular messages running the gamut from ancient maxims of the art of war to spiritual knowledge, wisdom and understanding from the Islamic Five Percent Nation." Steve Jones from USA Today wrote, "Hip-hop's most anticipated album crackles with the nine-member clan's unique hard-core rhymes and beats. On this two-disc, 112-minute set, the whole is definitely greater than the sum of its parts. The RZA avoids overproduction, using the beats to propel the lyrics, and keeps the music free of  clichéd R&B loops." Robert Christgau of The Village Voice gave the album a two-star honorable mention rating and called the Wu-Tang Clan "the five per cent nation of Oscar aspirations". In 2018, the BBC included it in their list of "the acclaimed albums that nobody listens to any more."

Accolades
Wu-Tang Forever was ranked as one of the best albums of the year by several notable  publications, such as Spin, The Village Voice, NME and Melody Maker. Popular Belgium magazine HUMO, and popular German magazine Spex both ranked it number six on their albums of the year lists. In 1999, Ego Trip ranked Wu-Tang Forever number three on their Hip Hop's 25 Greatest Albums by Year 1980–98 list. In their March 2005 issue, Hip Hop Connection ranked the album number 57 on their 100 Greatest Rap Albums 1995–2005 list. Also in 2005, Blow Up magazine from Italy included Wu-Tang Forever in their 600 Essential Albums list. It also earned the group a Grammy Award nomination for Best Rap Album at the 40th Annual Grammy Awards.

Commercial performance
Despite limited radio/TV airplay, and the nearly-six minute lead single "Triumph" which features no chorus, Wu-Tang Forever debuted at number one on the Billboard 200 with 612,000 copies sold in its first week. The album was certified 4× platinum by the Recording Industry Association of America (RIAA) on October 15, 1997 (each disc in the double album counted as separate unit for certification purpose), selling over 4 million copies in the United States. It is the group's highest selling album to date.

Track listing
Track listing information is taken from the official liner notes and AllMusic.Notes "Wu-Revolution" contains uncredited backing vocals by Blue Raspberry.
 "Reunited" contains backing vocals by Roxanne.
 "Projects" contains uncredited vocals by Shyheim.
 "Black Shampoo" contains uncredited vocals by P.R. Terrorist and Tekitha.Sample list'''
 "For Heavens Sake" contains a sample of "Don’t Leave Me Lonely" by King Floyd.
 "Cash Still Rules/Scary Hours (Still Don’t Nothing Move But the Money)" contains a sample of “The End of the World” by Skeeter Davis.
 "Severe Punishment" contains dialogue from ‘’The Master’’.
 "A Better Tomorrow" contains a sample of “The Love Theme” by Peter Nero.
 "It’s Yourz" contains a sample of “It’s Yours” by T La Rock & Jazzy Jay.
 "Little Ghetto Boy" contains a sample of "Little Ghetto Boy" by Donny Hathaway.
 "The City" contains a sample of “Living for the City” by Stevie Wonder.
 "The Projects" contains a sample of “Cry Together” by The O'Jays.
 "Hellz Wind Staff" contains dialogue from Unbeaten 28''.
 "Second Coming" contains an interpolation of "MacArthur Park" by Jimmy Webb.

Personnel

RZA – performer, producer, engineer, mixing, executive producer
GZA – performer
Ol' Dirty Bastard – performer
Method Man – performer
Raekwon – performer
Ghostface Killah – performer, executive producer
Inspectah Deck – performer, producer, mixing
U-God – performer
Masta Killa – performer
Cappadonna – performer
Street Life – performer
Tekitha – vocals
Popa Wu – vocals
Diva Gray - Background Vocals 
Robin Clark - Background Vocals 
Uncle Pete – vocals
Fourth Disciple – producer, engineer, mixing
True Master – producer, engineer, mixing
 Mitchell Diggs – executive producer
 Oli Grant – executive producer

 Divine – production coordination
 P.O.W.E.R. – production coordination
 Ney Pimentel – Creative direction, album artwork, photography, design and layout
 Carlos Bess – drums, mixing, mixing engineer
 Ramsey Jones – drums
 Scott Harding – mixing, mixing engineer
 Michael Reaves – mixing
 Troy Staton – mixing
 Tom Coyne – mastering
 Eugene Nastasi – editing
 Ola Kudu – Creative direction, album artwork, design and layout
Carlo Spicola – animation, VR and Enhanced CD content producer
 Sherin Baday – photography
 Bob Berg – photography
 Philippe McClelland – photography
 Shawn Mortenson – photography

Charts

Weekly charts

Year-end charts

Certifications

See also
List of Billboard 200 number-one albums of 1997
List of Billboard number-one R&B albums of 1997
Wu-Tang Forever (song)

References

External links
Wu-Tang Forever at Discogs
Wu-Tang Forever at MusicBrainz
Album review at RapReviews.com
Album accolades at acclaimedmusic.net

Wu-Tang Clan albums
1997 albums
Loud Records albums
Albums produced by RZA
Albums produced by True Master
Albums produced by 4th Disciple